Henry Birkhardt Harris (December 1, 1866 – April 15, 1912) was a Broadway producer and theatre owner who died in the sinking of the . His wife was future producer Renee Harris, who survived the sinking and lived until 1969.

Life
Harris was the son of William Harris Sr., a founder of the Theatrical Syndicate in the 1890s and Rachel Harris (née) Freefield. He had a younger brother, William Harris Jr. Harris was born in St. Louis in 1866 and was a young boy when the family moved to Boston. He began his career selling song books in the theater lobby as a young man in St. Louis.  When the family moved to Boston, young Harris began selling song books in the lobby of the Howard Athenaeum. He married Irene (Renee) Wallach, a legal secretary from Washington, D. C. with an interest in the theater on October 22, 1899.

Harris worked for his father in the theatrical business in Boston for a number of years before starting out on his own producing plays in 1901.  He managed such stars as Amelia Bingham and Robert Edeson. In 1906, Harris became the owner of the Hackett Theatre on 42nd Street. The theater was later renamed the Harris Theatre, to honor William Harris Sr. He leased and managed the Hudson Theatre in New York and in 1911 built the Folies Bergère Theatre.<ref>The Oxford Companion To American Theatre, 2nd edition by Gerald Bordman, c. 1992 page 323; by The Oxford University Press</ref>Who's who in music and drama: an encyclopedia biography of notable men by Dixie Hines & Harry Prescott Hanaford, page 156, c. 1914 The Folies Bergère was an attempt to emulate the success of its Parisian namesake. By September 1911 it had failed swiftly and heavily: Harris lost a reported $100,000 on the venture.

By April 1912 he was in London, arranging future performances of Maggie Pepper by Charles Klein with his star artiste Rose Stahl and the original American cast from the Harris Theatre. The play was made into a 1919 film of the same name. Harris also acquired an option on the US rights to The Miracle, the world's first full-color narrative feature film that would later show at the Royal Opera House.

Harris was one of the nearly 1,500 who died in Titanics sinking on April 15, 1912.

Although she had broken her right arm near the elbow in a fall on Titanics aft grand staircase earlier in the day, Renee Harris had refused to be parted from her husband. Mrs. Harris was rescued by the ship . She cabled the Hudson Theatre from the ship, saying that her husband was not among those on board, but hoped he had been saved by another rescue vessel. A story was circulated that Harris had been rescued by another ship and had wired his New York office to that effect, but this proved to be untrue. His body was lost at sea. If it was recovered and brought to Halifax by one of the cable ships sent out to look for bodies, it was never identified as such.

Portrayal
Harris was played by actor Ed Bishop in the 1979 film SOS Titanic. This was the only time Harris was featured in any of the many of Titanic films.

Selected productions

 Soldiers of Fortune (1901)
 Strongheart (1905)
 The Lion and the Mouse (1905)
 The Chorus Lady (1906) (*made star of Rose Stahl)
 The Struggle Everlasting (1907)
 The Traveling Salesman (1908)
 Pierre of the Plains (1908)
 The Third Degree (1909) (*made star of Helen Ware)
 Such a Little Queen (1909) (*made star of Elsie Ferguson)
 A Skylark (1910) (with May de Sousa)
 The Arab (1911)
 Strongheart'' (1914)

Notes

References

External links

 
 

1866 births
1912 deaths
Deaths on the RMS Titanic
Businesspeople from St. Louis
American theatre managers and producers
19th-century American businesspeople